Mount Osuzu is a mountain on the Japanese island of Kyushu. Part of an ancient volcanic formation known as the Osuzuyama volcano-plutonic complex, the mountain experienced a massive eruption in ~15.1 Ma. The mountain currently falls in the boundaries of Osuzu Prefectural Natural Park.

See also 
 List of mountains in Japan
 List of volcanoes in Japan

References 

Volcanoes of Kyushu
Osuzu